Tristram Coffin may refer to:
 Tristram Coffin (settler) (1606–1681), leader of a group of investors who bought Nantucket in 1659
 Tristram J. Coffin (born 1963), American attorney Vermont, former United States Attorney
 Tris Coffin (1909–1990), American film and television actor
 Tristram Potter Coffin (1922–2012), American academic and folklorist